The Namibia national under-19 cricket team represents Namibia in under-19 international cricket. Namibia has won the ICC Africa Under-19 Championships a record number of times.

Namibia has qualified for the Under-19 World Cup on eight occasions, more than any other associate member of the International Cricket Council (ICC). The team's best performance was at the 2016 Under-19 World Cup in Bangladesh, where it defeated defending champions South Africa in the group stage and eventually placed seventh, equaling's Afghanistan's performance at the 2014 event as the best by an associate. By finishing as the best-ranked associate team at the 2016 World Cup, Namibia secured automatic qualification for the 2018 World Cup in New Zealand.

Current squad
Namibia's squad at the 2016 Under-19 World Cup was as follows:

Coach:  Rangarirai Manyande

List of captains
As of 2016, nine cricketers have captained Namibia in under-19 One Day International (ODI) matches.

Records
All records listed are for under-19 One Day International (ODI) matches only, and are correct as of the 2016 U-19 World Cup

Team records

Highest totals
 263/9 (50 overs), v. , at ICC Academy Ground, Dubai, 24 February 2014
 237/6 (43.3 overs), v. , at Eden Park, Auckland, 28 January 2002
 231/5 (50 overs), v. , at Galle International Stadium, Galle, 21 January 2000

Lowest totals
 55 (30.4 overs), v. , at P. Sara Stadium, Colombo, 11 January 2000
 57 (28.3 overs), v. , Uyanwatte Stadium, Matara, 19 January 2000
 65 (32.5 overs), v. , Cox's Bazar Cricket Stadium, Cox's Bazar, 2 February 2016

Individual records

Most career runs
 435 – Stephan Swanepoel (from 19 matches between 1998 and 2002, at an average of 24.16)
 311 – Dawid Botha (from 9 matches between 2006 and 2008, at an average of 44.42)
 297 – Gerhard Erasmus (from 11 matches between 2012 and 2014, at an average of 29.70)

Highest individual scores
 142 (131 balls) – Stephan Swanepoel, v. , at Eden Park, Auckland, 28 January 2002
 84 (119 balls) – Gerhard Erasmus, v. , at Sheikh Zayed Stadium, Abu Dhabi, 19 February 2014
 78 (116 balls) – Xander Pitchers, v. , at Sheikh Zayed Stadium, Abu Dhabi, 22 February 2014

Most career wickets
 20 – Burton van Rooi (from 13 matches between 2000 and 2002, at an average of 19.80)
 17 – Bredell Wessels (from 9 matches between 2012 and 2014, at an average of 22.58)
 15 – Fritz Coetzee (from 6 matches in 2016, at an average of 15.93)

Best bowling performances
 5/29 (10 overs) – Rudi Scholtz, v. , at NF Oppenheimer Ground, Johannesburg, 13 January 1998
 4/24 (6.2 overs) – Michael van Lingen, v. , at Khan Shaheb Osman Ali Stadium, Fatullah, 11 February 2016
 4/24 (10 overs) – Michael van Lingen, v. , at Cox's Bazar Cricket Stadium, Cox's Bazar, 31 January 2016

References

Under-19 cricket teams
Cricket under-19
Namibia in international cricket